Zherdevka is the name of several inhabited localities in Russia.

Urban localities
Zherdevka, Tambov Oblast, a town in Zherdevsky District of Tambov Oblast

Rural localities
Zherdevka, Belgorod Oblast, a khutor in Valuysky District of Belgorod Oblast